Marco Andreini (born 8 October 1961) is an Italian retired pole vaulter.

Biography
He won the bronze medal at the 1991 Mediterranean Games, ten centimetres behind Philippe d'Encausse and Jean-Marc Tailhardat. He also finished sixteenth at the 1977 European Indoor Championships, and competed at the 1990 European Championships without reaching the final.

He became Italian champion in 1988 and 1989. He succeeded Gianni Stecchi as champion and was succeeded by Gianni Iapichino. He also became Italian indoor champion in 1985 and 1986. His personal best jump was 5.68 metres, achieved in September 1990 in Siderno.

Masters athletics
Its measure of 4.90 m obtained on 10 June 2001 at age 41 is the 14th all-time performance in the category M45.

Achievements

National titles
MArco Andreini has won four times the individual national championship.
2 wins in Pole vault (1988, 1989)
2 wins in Pole vault indoor (1985, 1986)

See also
 Italian all-time top lists - Pole vault

References

External links
 

1961 births
Living people
Italian male pole vaulters
Mediterranean Games bronze medalists for Italy
Athletes (track and field) at the 1991 Mediterranean Games
Mediterranean Games medalists in athletics
20th-century Italian people
21st-century Italian people